Federico Delbonis was the defending champion but chose not to compete.

Alejandro Falla won the final against Italian Paolo Lorenzi with partial 7–5, 6–1, and in which it becomes the first Colombian to win this tournament, Carlos Salamanca was as yet the only Colombian to reach the final losing in 2009.

Seeds

Draw

Finals

Top half

Bottom half

References
 Main Draw
 Qualifying Draw

Bucaramanga Open - Singles
2014 Singles